Amader Shomoy is a Bengali language daily newspaper from Bangladesh. Amader Shomoy started publishing in 2003 under Nayeemul Islam Khan but was removed as publisher by a court order in 2012.

Supplements
 সময়ের ডানা Shomoyer Dana ("Different light"): Friday supplement
 আইটি সময় IT Somoy ("IT SHOMOY"): Daily ICT News Corner on information technology

Former editors
 Nayeemul Islam Khan: 2003- 2011
 Abu Hasan Shahriar: 2011 - 2014

References

External links
 Official website of Amader Shomoy
 epaper website of Amader Shomoy

2003 establishments in Bangladesh
Publications established in 2003
Bengali-language newspapers published in Bangladesh
Daily newspapers published in Bangladesh
Newspapers published in Dhaka